The Kitty Wells Family Gospel Sing is a gospel music album recorded by Kitty Wells and released in 1965 on the Decca label (DL 4679). Thom Owens of Allmusic called it "a good, but unremarkable, country gospel LP."

Track listing
Side A
 "Jesus Is Coming Soon" (Bill Phillips) [2:13]
 "A Family Gathering at Home" (Roy Botkin) [2:05]
 "Where the Soul of Man Never Dies" (Johnny Wright) [2:14]
 "Let's Regain the Garden" (Herman Phillips) [2:56]
 "Shake My Mother's Hand for Me" (Johnny Wright) [2:20]
 "Heaven" (Don W. Mosher) [2:17]

Side B
 "Glory Land March" (Johnnie Masters) [2:13]
 "Precious Memories" (adapted and arranged by Johnny Wright) [2:46]
 "I'm on My Way" (Bill Phillips) [2:12]
 "Thank God for a Mother Like Mine" (Johnnie Bailes) [2:18]
 "(With My Friends At) Old Country Church" (Johnny Wright) [1:50]
 "There's No Greater Time Than Now" (Roy Botkin) [2:51]

References

1965 albums
Kitty Wells albums